Chae Yoo-jung (Hanja: 蔡侑玎; born 9 May 1995) is a South Korean badminton player. She is the daughter of former singles player Kim Bok-sun. Chae was a part of the Korean national team that won the world mixed team championships at the 2017 Sudirman Cup.

Career 
Chae competed at the 2020 Summer Olympics in the mixed doubles partnered with Seo Seung-jae, and her pace was stopped in the quarter-finals.

Achievements

Asian Championships 
Mixed doubles

East Asian Games 
Women's doubles

Mixed doubles

BWF World Junior Championships 
Girls' doubles

Mixed doubles

Asian Junior Championships 
Girls' doubles

Mixed doubles

BWF World Tour (4 titles, 7 runners-up) 
The BWF World Tour, which was announced on 19 March 2017 and implemented in 2018, is a series of elite badminton tournaments sanctioned by the Badminton World Federation (BWF). The BWF World Tours are divided into levels of World Tour Finals, Super 1000, Super 750, Super 500, Super 300 (part of the HSBC World Tour), and the BWF Tour Super 100.

Mixed doubles

BWF Grand Prix (4 titles, 8 runners-up) 
The BWF Grand Prix had two levels, the Grand Prix and Grand Prix Gold. It was a series of badminton tournaments sanctioned by the Badminton World Federation (BWF) and played between 2007 and 2017.

Women's doubles

Mixed doubles

  BWF Grand Prix Gold tournament
  BWF Grand Prix tournament

BWF International Challenge/Series (1 title, 2 runners-up) 
Women's doubles

Mixed doubles

  BWF International Challenge tournament
  BWF International Series tournament

References

External links 
 
 

1995 births
Living people
Sportspeople from Busan
South Korean female badminton players
Badminton players at the 2020 Summer Olympics
Olympic badminton players of South Korea
Badminton players at the 2018 Asian Games
Asian Games competitors for South Korea